The 1992–93 Edmonton Oilers season was the Oilers' 14th season in the National Hockey League (NHL). They were coming off an appearance in the Campbell Conference finals in 1991–92, losing to the Chicago Blackhawks in a four-game sweep. It was the team's third straight appearance in the conference finals, and eighth in ten years.

Prior to the season, the Oilers would trade away their leading scorer from the previous season, Vincent Damphousse, along with their fourth-round draft pick in 1993, to the Montreal Canadiens in exchange for Shayne Corson, Brent Gilchrist and Vladimir Vujtek. The loss of Damphousse hurt the Oilers offensively, as in 1992–93, they would score a franchise-low 242 goals.

The Oilers would struggle all season long. By the trade deadline, it was all but certain that they would fail to qualify for the playoffs for the first time since joining the NHL in 1979, and only the third time overall in franchise history. Edmonton would trade Esa Tikkanen to the New York Rangers for Doug Weight, Bernie Nicholls to the New Jersey Devils for Zdeno Ciger, and Kevin Todd, and Craig Muni to the Chicago Blackhawks for Mike Hudson. The team was mathematically eliminated from playoff contention for the first time in franchise history on March 26 with a 4-1 loss at the hands of the Los Angeles Kings. They would finish the season with a franchise low 26 wins and 60 points, along with a franchise-high 50 losses, and missed the playoffs by 27 points.

The Oilers finished last in power-play goals, tied with the Ottawa Senators and San Jose Sharks, with 66.

Offensively, Petr Klima would lead the Oilers with 32 goals and 48 points, while Shayne Corson chipped in with 16 goals and 47 points. Bernie Nicholls would record 40 points in 46 games before being traded. On the blueline, Dave Manson would anchor the defense, scoring 15 goals and 45 points, while posting a team high 210 penalty minutes.

In goal, Bill Ranford would appear in 67 games, winning 17 of them, while posting a 3.84 GAA and a shutout.  Ron Tugnutt would back him up, winning 9 games with a 4.12 GAA.

Season standings

Schedule and results

Season stats

Scoring leaders

Goaltending

Awards and records

Awards

Milestones

Transactions

Trades

Free agents

Draft picks
Edmonton's draft picks at the 1992 NHL Entry Draft

References

National Hockey League Guide & Record Book 2007

Edmonton Oilers season, 1992-93
Edmon
Edmonton Oilers seasons